Dick Wesolowski (born December 5, 1945) was a Canadian football player who played for the Hamilton Tiger-Cats and Calgary Stampeders. He won the Grey Cup with Hamilton in 1972. Wesolowski played college football at University of North Carolina at Chapel Hill.

References

1945 births
Living people
Hamilton Tiger-Cats players
Calgary Stampeders players
North Carolina Tar Heels football players
American football running backs
Canadian football running backs
California Golden Bears football players
Canadian players of American football
Sportspeople from Hamilton, Ontario
Players of Canadian football from Ontario